Herman Sidney "Eagle" Day was a punter in the National Football League and a quarterback in the Canadian Football League. Eagle Day may also refer to:

 Eagle Day, known in German as Adlertag, the first day of operations in the German Operation Eagle Attack during the Battle of Britain
 "Eagle Day", an episode from the first series of the crime drama Foyle's War
 Eagle Day, the second novel in Robert Muchamore's Henderson's Boys series